ACA International Cricket Stadium (also known as Andhra Cricket Association International Cricket Stadium) is a cricket stadium under construction in the town of Mangalagiri which is the part of the Mangalagiri Tadepalle Municipal Corporation and Vijayawada Metropolitan Area.

In 2000, Andhra Cricket Association wanted to construct an International Stadium in Vijayawada, but due to lack of area this stadium plan was moved to Mangalagiri. Although cricket ground has been constructed, the stadium construction along with audience gallery did not start.

In 2013, Andhra Cricket Association proposed construction of the central zone stadium in mangalagiri as part of zonal wise academies with North and south zone academies in vizianagaram and kadapa respectively. ACA  tried to start the construction and Indoor stadium has been built next to the cricket ground for players to practice cricket. But the main stadium construction was quickly put on hold at the foundation level, because of architectural issues. As the plan to setup capital for newly formed state of Andhra Pradesh, the works of the stadium resumed from 2015.

Anurag Thakur (then BCCI Chief), Galla Jayadev (Member of Parliament), Kesineni Srinivas (Member of Parliament), and Devineni Uma Maheswara Rao inaugurated the stadium at A.P Capital Amaravati on 30 May 2016, with construction company IVRCL Limited winning the rights for the project, worth . It is owned by Andhra Cricket Association.

VVS Laxman, the former Indian batsman, inaugurated the Central Zone Academy of Andhra Cricket Association in June 2013. The stadium will include a club house and an indoor cricket academy. The Board of Control for Cricket in India made Andhra Cricket Association the headquarters of the Indian women's cricket team.

References 

Cricket grounds in Andhra Pradesh
Sport in Guntur
1983 establishments in Andhra Pradesh
 
Sports venues completed in 1983
20th-century architecture in India